Nyamo, or Nianmu, is a township of Samzhubzê District (Shigatse City), in the Tibet Autonomous Region of China. , it had 10 villages under its administration.

References 

Township-level divisions of Tibet
Samzhubzê District